Roast-Beef and Movies is a short subject starring George Givot, Curly Howard (billed as "Jerry Howard"), Bobby Callahan, and the Albertina Rasch Dancers, released by Metro-Goldwyn-Mayer (MGM) on February 10, 1934. The music is by Dimitri Tiomkin, who was married to Rasch at the time.

Plot
Three good-for-nothings overhear a movie producer and his partners offering a grand sum if someone will present him with a sure-fire movie idea. The leader of the three dopes, Gus Parkyakarkus (George Givot), barges into the meeting with his cohorts and proceeds to rattle off spiels for several inane prospective movies. The three are delighted to be told they have made a sale, but the producers turn out to be inmates from an insane asylum.

Cast
George Givot — Gus Parkyurkarkus
Jerry Howard — Secretary stooge
Bobby Callahan — Vice President stooge
Frank O'Connor — MPC President
Si Jenks — MPC Producer
Warren Hymer — Man at gunpoint
Ed Brady — Gunman
Dorothy Granger — Easter Wester
Jack Cheatham — 1st attendant
Lee Phelps — 2nd attendant
James Burrows — "Blue Daughter From Heaven" vocalist
The Albertina Rasch Girls

Production notes
Roast-Beef and Movies was an attempt by MGM (never known for producing skilled comedies) to create its own Three Stooge-themed comedy, with Givot as the Moe Howard-like leader, and Curly Howard – an actual Stooge – in the role normally played by middleman Larry Fine. Third wheel Bobby Callahan portrayed the "dumb-but-likable" character that Howard normally played. The film is the only known solo appearance of Curly Howard, appearing without fellow Stooges Moe and Larry or then-superior Ted Healy.

Roast-Beef and Movies was one of three MGM Stooge-related shorts filmed using the two-color Technicolor process, originally billed as Colortone Musical Revues. This process was also used in the 1933 films Nertsery Rhymes and Hello Pop!, both starring Ted Healy and His Stooges (Howard, Fine and Howard) and Bonnie Bonnell. The use of color was predicated on the decision to build plot devices in Roast-Beef and Movies around the following discarded Technicolor musical numbers from earlier 1930 MGM films:
"Blue Daughter From Heaven" (Chinese ballet) from Lord Byron of Broadway;
"Dust" from Children of Pleasure.

Home media
Warner Archive released Roast-Beef and Movies on September 24, 2014 on DVD in region 1 as part of the Classic Shorts From The Dream Factory Series, Volume 3 (featuring Howard, Fine and Howard). The film was released with five other Ted Healy/Stooge shorts made for MGM: Plane Nuts (1933), Hello Pop! (1933), Beer and Pretzels (1933), Nertsery Rhymes (1933), and The Big Idea (1934).

See also
Three Stooges Filmography

References

External links
Roast-Beef and Movies at IMDB

1934 films
Metro-Goldwyn-Mayer films
American musical comedy films
1934 musical comedy films
1930s American films